The 2005–06 season was Kilmarnock's seventh consecutive season in the Scottish Premier League, having competed in it since its inauguration in 1998–99. Kilmarnock also competed in the Scottish Cup and the League Cup.

Summary

Season
Kilmarnock finished fifth in the Scottish Premier League with 55 points. They reached the third round of the League Cup, losing to Dunfermline and the third round of the Scottish Cup, losing to Hearts.

Results and fixtures

Scottish Premier League

Scottish League Cup

Scottish Cup

Player statistics

|}

Final league table

Division summary

Transfers

Players in

Players out

References

External links
 Kilmarnock 2005–06 at Soccerbase.com (select relevant season from dropdown list)

Kilmarnock F.C. seasons
Kilmarnock